Wiggle is a European online sports retailer, selling cycle, run, swim and outdoor equipment and apparel. It is based in Portsmouth, England.

The company is part of the WiggleCRC group, which also includes Chain Reaction Cycles.

History 

The origins of Wiggle trace back to a local bike shop called Butlers Cycles, located in Portsmouth. Mitch Dall, a founder of Wiggle, bought the shop in 1995.

Wiggle started trading in May 1999, with an initial investment of £2000 from Dall and Harvey Jones.

Between 1999 and 2009, Wiggle experimented with online retail, and experienced strong growth.

By 2006, Wiggle was turning over £11.8m and Livingbridge private equity took a 42% stake in the company. After a further three years of 40% growth, Livingbridge bought the remaining 58% in 2009, including  Dall's remaining 26% stake.

Livingbridge brought in Humphrey Cobbold as CEO in December 2009. By 2011, projected annual revenue was £118m following strong international growth helped by a weak pound. Andy Bond, the former CEO of Asda, was hired to help this process.

In 2011, Livingbridge considered taking the company public in an initial public offering, with the company's overall value estimated at £200m, and pre-tax profits having risen from £7.1m to £10.2m in the year to January 2011, following a 123 percent increase in international sales.

After an auction in December 2011, Wiggle was acquired by venture capitalists Bridgepoint Capital for £180m. Wiggle was now one of 6 European online sports retailers, and no 2 in the UK to Chain Reaction Cycles.

In September 2013, after the sale of the business, Cobbold stepped down and Stefan Barden (former CEO of Northern Foods) took over.

In 2015, the company consolidated its 3 owned and 1 rented warehouses in Portsmouth to a newer larger 320,000 sq ft facility in Wolverhampton.

In 2015, Andy Bond stepped down and Brian McBride joined as chairman. McBride was formerly the CEO of Amazon UK and is the chairman of the online fashion clothing retailer ASOS.

WiggleCRC 

The merger of Wiggle and Chain Reaction Cycles was announced in 2016: by this time No1 and No2 largest global online players in the cycle and tri sports product categories.

In late 2016, Stefan Barden was replaced by Will Kernan  as the new Group CEO   - Kernan was previously the CEO of The White Company, and before that MD and COO at New Look. In January 2019, it was stated that Kernan was to be replaced by Ross Clemmow, a former Debenhams director.

The WiggleCRC Group formed after the Competition Commission approved the merger and Wiggle bought 100% of the Chain Reactions Cycle equity from the Watson family for £62m. A key driver of synergies was the closure of CRC’s Northern Irish warehouse and distribution infrastructure whose volume was integrated into Citadel in Wolverhampton; this process was concluded in December 2017.

The Wiggle and Chain Reaction Cycles brands remain distinct, with their own websites. Proforma turnover was over £360m in 2017 and Wiggle was the largest pure-play online sports retailer in Europe.

In October 2017 it was announced that WiggleCRC had bought a German competitor and market no.2, Bike 24, for a reported £100m, giving  access to German suppliers and a potential 'Brexit hedge'.

Group Proforma sales are now believed to be about £500m, and it was announced that the Bike24 brand and websites will continue alongside the Wiggle and Chain Reaction Cycles websites.

In 2018, a Chain Reaction Cycles' employee was critical of the group's actions after the merger; citing continued redundancies, shift patterns and a perceived shift of operations away from Ireland to Wolverhampton.

References

Companies based in Portsmouth
Retail companies established in 1999
Internet properties established in 1999
Online retailers of the United Kingdom
Cycle retailers
1999 establishments in England